The Constitutional Court of the Russian Federation is a high court within the judiciary of Russia which is empowered to rule on whether certain laws or presidential decrees are in fact contrary to the Constitution of Russia. Its objective is only to protect the Constitution (in Russian constitutional law this function is known as "constitutional control" or "constitutional supervision") and deal with a few kinds of disputes where it has original jurisdiction, whereas the highest court of appeal is the Supreme Court of the Russian Federation.

History

 
Before the 1980s in the USSR the importance of judicial supervision over compatibility of legislation and executive actions with the provisions and principles of the constitution was not recognized. It was not until December 25, 1989 when Constitutional Control in the USSR Act was passed, that such "judicial review" was initiated. Accordingly, the Constitutional Supervision Committee was created. It started functioning mid-1990 and was dissolved towards the end of 1991. In December 1990 the Constitution of the Russian Soviet Federated Socialist Republic (RSFSR) was amended with provisions which provided for creation of Constitutional Court (whereas a similar USSR body was called a Committee, not a Court). On July 12, 1991 Constitutional Court of the RSFSR Act was adopted. In October the Fifth Congress of People's Deputies of the Russian SFSR has elected 13 members of the Court and the Constitutional Court de facto started functioning. From November 1991 till October 1993 it rendered some decisions of great significance. For example, it declared unconstitutional certain decrees of Presidium of the Supreme Soviet, which were adopted ultra vires, and forbade the practice of extrajudicial eviction. More often, however, it declared President Yeltsin's decrees unconstitutional, leading critics to argue it took the side of the Supreme Soviet in the power struggle.

On October 7, 1993 Boris Yeltsin's decree suspended work of the Constitutional Court. According to the decree, the Constitutional Court was "in deep crisis". On December 24 another presidential decree repealed the Constitutional Court of the RSFSR Act itself. 
In July 1994 the new Constitutional Court Act was adopted. However, the new Constitutional Court started working only in February 1995, because the Federation Council of Russia refused several times to appoint judges nominated by Yeltsin.

In 2005 the federal authorities proposed to transfer the court from Moscow to Saint Petersburg. The transfer, involving controversial allocation of land on Krestovsky Island for cottages of the judges and relocation of the Russian State Historical Archive from the former Senate and Synod Building, now occupied by the court headquarters, had been completed by 2008.

President Dmitry Medvedev on May 8, 2009, proposed to the legislature and on June 2 signed a law for an amendment whereby the chairperson of the court and his deputies would be proposed to the parliament by the president rather than elected by the judges, as was the case before.

Constitutional Court Judge Vladimir Yaroslavtsev in an interview to the Spanish newspaper El País published on August 31, 2009, claimed that the presidential executive office and security services had undermined judicial independence in Russia. In October the Constitutional Court in an unprecedented motion accused Yaroslavtsev of "undermining the authority of the judiciary" in violation of the judicial code and forced him to resign from the Council of Judges. Judge Anatoly Kononov, who had frequently dissented from decisions taken by the majority of the court, in his interview to Sobesednik supported Yaroslavtsev, claiming that there was no independent judiciary in Russia and criticized the new amendments concerning appointment of the court chairman as undemocratic. The Constitutional Court forced Kononov to step down from the Constitutional Court on January 1, 2010, 7 years ahead of schedule.

Composition

The Constitutional Court of the Russian Federation consists of 11 judges, one being the Chairman (currently Valery Zorkin) and another one being Deputy Chairman. The Chairman is responsible for the allocation of cases to chambers, has considerable powers in the matters of appointment, and makes the initial recommendation for disciplinary measures, in particular dismissal.

The judges are nominated by the President and appointed by the Federation Council for 12 years. In order to become a judge of the Constitutional Court a person must be a citizen of Russia, at least 40 years of age, have legal education, have served as a lawyer for at least 15 years and have "recognized high qualification" (quotation from Constitutional Court Act) in law.

The Constitutional Court consists of two chambers with 10 and 9 judges respectively. The Chairman presides over one of the chambers and the Deputy Chairman presides over the other chamber. Constitutionality of laws, disputes concerning competence of governmental agencies, impeachment of the president of Russia and the Constitutional Court's proposals of legislations must be dealt with in plenary session. The Constitutional Court also may by its discretion submit to plenary sessions any other issue.

Powers 

Certain powers of the Constitutional Court are enumerated in the Constitution of Russia. The Constitutional Court declares laws, presidential and governmental decrees and laws of federal subjects unconstitutional if it finds that they are contrary to the Constitution (i.e. they violate certain rights and freedoms of citizens enumerated in and protected by the Constitution). In such instances, that particular law becomes unenforceable, and governmental agencies are barred from implementing it. Also, before an international treaty is ratified by the State Duma, the constitutionality of the treaty may be observed by the Constitutional Court. The Constitutional Court is not entitled to judge constitutionality of laws on its own initiative; the law may be submitted to the Constitutional Court by the President of Russia, the government of Russia, the State Duma, the Federation Council of Russia, one-fifth of members of the State Duma or the Federation Council, the Supreme Court of the Russian Federation, the Supreme Arbitration Court of the Russian Federation, or a legislative body of a Federal subject. Any federal court may request the Constitutional Court to judge on the constitutionality of a law if the law is to be implemented in a case, and a judge of the federal court is in doubt about whether the law is contrary to the Constitution. Also, any private citizen may submit in the Constitutional Court a claim challenging constitutionality of a particular law if that law was implemented in a particular case and thus violated rights of that citizen.

Another power of the Constitutional Court is to resolve disputes concerning competence of governmental agencies. Whenever the President of Russia is impeached, the Constitutional Court renders a resolution concerning complying with the due order of indictment.

Procedure 
The Constitutional Court deals with cases either in chambers or in plenary sessions. All judges must be present unless they are sick or may have interest in the case; they must not abstain from voting on the resolution. Apart from judges, claimant, his representatives and governmental agencies involved are present. In order for resolution or decision to pass two-thirds of judges must be in favor of it.

Chairpersons 

 Valery Zorkin (1977–1993)
 Vladimir Tumanov (1995–1997)
 Marat Baglai (1997–2003)
 Valery Zorkin (since 2003)

Presidential Envoys to the Constitutional Court 

 Valery Savitsky (April 24, 1995, – February 5, 1996)
 Mikhail Mityukov (February 5 – December 7, 1996)
 Sergey Shakhray (December 7, 1996, – June 29, 1998)
 Mikhail Mityukov (June 29, 1998, – November 7, 2005)
 Mikhail Krotov (November 7, 2005 – January 31, 2020)
 Aleksandr Konovalov  (since January 31, 2020)

See also 
 Constitutional law
 Judiciary of Russia
 Law of the Russian Federation
 Legal reform
 Rule of law
 Rule According to Higher Law
 Supreme Court of the Russian Federation
 List of constitutional courts

References

External links 

 Official Website (Russian)
The state of the judiciary in Russia International Commission of Jurists, 2010
Judging Russia: The Role of the Constitutional Court in Russian Politics 1990–2006
Authoritarian constitutionalism in Putin's Russia: A pragmatic constitutional court in a dual state. Communist and Post-Communist Studies, 51(3), 201-214

Russian constitutional law
Government of Russia
Russia
Courts in Russia
1991 establishments in Russia
Courts and tribunals established in 1991